Heinz-Helmut Wehling (born 8 September 1950 in Bad Frankenhausen) is a German former wrestler who competed in the 1972 Summer Olympics and in the 1976 Summer Olympics.

References

1950 births
Living people
Olympic wrestlers of East Germany
Wrestlers at the 1972 Summer Olympics
Wrestlers at the 1976 Summer Olympics
German male sport wrestlers
Olympic silver medalists for East Germany
Olympic bronze medalists for East Germany
Olympic medalists in wrestling
Medalists at the 1976 Summer Olympics
Medalists at the 1972 Summer Olympics
People from Bad Frankenhausen
Sportspeople from Thuringia
20th-century German people
21st-century German people